Milan Mrkusich  (5 April 1925 – 13 June 2018) was a New Zealand artist and designer. He was considered a pioneer of abstract painting in New Zealand. Retrospective exhibitions of his work were organised by the Auckland Art Gallery in 1972 and 1985, and at the Gus Fisher Gallery in 2009. A substantial monograph was published by Auckland University Press in 2009.

Mrkusich was appointed an Officer of the New Zealand Order of Merit, for services to painting, in the 1997 Queen's Birthday Honours, and was one of ten inaugural Icon Award recipients from the Arts Foundation of New Zealand in 2003.

Education
Milan Mrkusich was born in Dargaville to emigrant Croatian parents from a village of Podgora in the Dalmatia region of Croatia. The family moved to Auckland in 1927, and Milan attended St Joseph's Convent (Parnell), Marist Brothers School (Ponsonby), and Sacred Heart College.

In 1942 he took an apprenticeship in Writing and Pictorial Arts at Neuline Studios and attended the Seddon Memorial Technical College (now Auckland University of Technology) commercial art course.

Architecture and design
Influenced by the Bauhaus movement, it is probably no coincidence that Mrkusich's first solo exhibition was held at The University of Auckland's School of Architecture in 1949.

Mrkusich was heavily involved in the work of Brenner Associates. Formed in 1949, Brenner Associates comprised architects Stephen Jelicich, Desmond Mullen and Vladimir Cacala, working with Mrkusich and designer John Butterworth. Aside from architectural work, Brenner offered integrated interior, exhibition, lighting and furniture design, for which Mrkusich contributed interior and furniture design, as well as designing and building his own (award-winning) home (1950).

Mrkusich was also responsible for the design of several murals, mosaics and stained glass windows, including the windows of St Joseph's Catholic Church, Grey Lynn, Auckland (1958–60) and the B.J. Ball Paper mural in Graham Street, Downtown Auckland.

Developing abstraction
In the 1970s, with fellow pioneer of New Zealand abstraction, Gordon Walters, Mrkusich exhibited at the Petar/James Gallery, run from 1972-76 by outspoken art dealer brothers Petar and James Vuletic. Like American critic Clement Greenberg, Vuletic had strong views on modernism and championed a group of like-minded artists, he had purchased works by Mrkusich and Walters in 1968. Other artists in the Vuletic circle include Stephen Bambury, Richard Killeen, and Ian Scott.

Career
The Auckland Art Gallery gave him a survey exhibition in 1972, and another in 1985. A further retrospective was held at the Gus Fisher Gallery in 2009, touring to City Gallery Wellington in 2010.

His work is held in most significant public collections in New Zealand including Museum of New Zealand Te Papa Tongarewa, Auckland Art Gallery, Christchurch Art Gallery, Govett-Brewster Art Gallery, Dunedin Public Art Gallery and The University of Auckland.

Further reading

 Jim and Mary Barr, Contemporary New Zealand Painters (Martinborough: Alister Tayler, 1980)
 Gordon H. Brown and Hamish Keith An Introduction to New Zealand Painting (Auckland: Collins, 1982)
 Ronald Brownson (ed), Milan Mrkusich: A Decade Further On 1974–1983 (Auckland: Auckland Art Gallery, 1985) 
 Michael Dunn and Petar Vuletic, Milan Mrkusich: Paintings 1946–1972 (Auckland: Auckland Art Gallery, 1972)
 Michael Dunn, New Zealand Painting: A Concise History (Auckland: Auckland University Press, 2003)
 Francis Pound, Forty Modern New Zealand Paintings (Auckland: Penguin, 1985) 
 Alan Wright and Edward Hanfling, Mrkusich: The Art of Transformation (Auckland: Auckland University Press, 2009) 
 Alan Wright, 'The Alchemy of the Painted Surface: The Early Work of Milan Mrkusich 1960–65' in Art New Zealand Number 82/Autumn 1997

References

External links
Works by Milan Mrkusich in the collection of the Museum of New Zealand Te Papa Tongarewa
Artworks by Milan Mrkusich in the collection of the Auckland Art Gallery
Peter Leach, 'Milan Mrkusich: The Architecture of the Painted Surface' in Art New Zealand, Number 19/Autumn 1981
Rodney Wilson, 'Formal Abstraction in Post-War New Zealand Painting' in Art New Zealand Number 2/October-November 1976
New Zealand Arts Foundation biography
Gordon H. Brown, 'The Pursuit of Modernism in the 1940s and Early 1950s' in Art New Zealand Number 30/Autumn 1984
John Daly-Peoples, 'The Transformation of Milan Mrkusich' in The National Business Review, Tuesday, 24 March 2009
Andrew Clifford, 'Canon of abstract art shows plenty of firepower' in New Zealand Herald, Wednesday, 6 July 2005
Peter Simpson, 'Perceptive look at the abstract' in New Zealand Herald, Saturday, 4 April 2009
Architecture and design firm, Brenner Associates

1925 births
2018 deaths
New Zealand painters
Modern painters
Officers of the New Zealand Order of Merit
New Zealand people of Croatian descent
Auckland University of Technology alumni
People from Dargaville